AZW may refer to:

Air Zimbabwe, or AZW in the ICAO airline code
.azw, file format used by the Amazon Kindle e-Book reader
Architekturzentrum Wien, part of Museumsquartier in Vienna